George Lovic Pierce Radcliffe (August 22, 1877July 29, 1974) was a Democratic member of the United States Senate who represented Maryland from 1935 to 1947.

Background
Radcliffe was born on a farm at Lloyds, near Cambridge, Maryland.  He attended both public and private schools in his youth and later graduated from Cambridge Seminary in 1893, from Johns Hopkins University in 1897, from the graduate school of Johns Hopkins University in 1900, and from the University of Maryland School of Law in 1903.

Career
Following college, Radcliffe took the position of principal of the Cambridge Seminary he had attended as a youth.  After a stint as a teacher in the Baltimore City College in 1901 and 1902, Radcliffe was admitted to the bar in 1903 and commenced practice in Baltimore, Maryland with an interest in banking and farming.

During the First World War, Radcliffe joined the Liquor License Commission in Baltimore, serving from 1916–1919, and also served as a member of the Maryland State Council of Defense.

State Government
In 1919, Radcliffe was selected as Secretary of State of Maryland and served until 1920.

Federal Government
In 1933 and again in 1934, Radcliffe was chosen regional adviser of the Public Works Administration for Maryland, Delaware, Virginia, West Virginia, North Carolina, Tennessee, Kentucky, and the District of Columbia.

U.S. Senate
In the election of 1934, Radcliffe was elected as a Democrat to the United States Senate, and was subsequently reelected in the 1940 election.  Radcliffe failed to achieve re-nomination for his party in the election of 1946, losing to fellow Democrat Herbert R. O'Conor.

Personal and death
Radcliffe resumed banking and farming interests following his tenure as senator and was actively involved in civic life.

He resided in Baltimore until he died on July 29, 1974. He is buried at the Cambridge Cemetery in his hometown.

Miscellaneous

In 1935, Alger Hiss attorney and close friend William L. Marbury, Jr. wrote to Radcliffe to secure his support for the appointment of Hiss to the U.S. Solicitor General's office. (Hiss and Radcliffe were both from Baltimore, graduates of Johns Hopkins University, and officials in Franklin Roosevelt's New Deal government.)

References

External sources

1877 births
1974 deaths
University of Maryland Francis King Carey School of Law alumni
Democratic Party United States senators from Maryland
Secretaries of State of Maryland
Johns Hopkins University alumni
People from Dorchester County, Maryland
Baltimore City College faculty
Maryland Democrats